The 1955–56 Chicago Black Hawks season was the team's 30th season in the NHL, and the club was coming off their second straight last place finish in 1954–55, when they had a record of 13–40–17, earning 43 points.  The struggling franchise had finished in the NHL cellar for seven times in the past nine seasons.

The Black Hawks would not bring back head coach Frank Eddolls, as they hired Dick Irvin, who had previously coached the Black Hawks in 1928–29 and 1930–31.  After leaving Chicago in 1931, Irvin would coach the Toronto Maple Leafs from 1931–40, winning the 1932 Stanley Cup, then he went on to coach the Montreal Canadiens from 1940–55, winning three Stanley Cups with the team in 1944, 1946 and 1953.  Also, in the off-season, the Hawks acquired Johnny Wilson and Glen Skov from the Detroit Red Wings.

The team would get off to their best start in a few seasons, as they played .500 hockey in their opening 10 games, as Chicago had a record of 4–4–2.  The team would hover around the .500 mark through the first 23 games before falling into a slump, in which they would go 11–30–6 in their remaining 47 games to finish the season in last place for the eighth time in ten seasons.  Despite the last place finish, Chicago improved their win total to 19 games and their point total to 50, which represented their highest totals since the 1952–53 season.

Offensively, Chicago was led by Red Sullivan, who had a team high 40 points, as he scored 14 goals and added 26 assists.  Newly acquired Johnny Wilson scored a team high 24 goals, becoming the first Black Hawk since 1953 to score over 20 goals, while Ed Litzenberger had a club best 29 assists, en route to a 39-point season.  Allan Stanley led the defense with 14 assists and 18 points, while fellow blueliner Jack McIntyre scored a defense leading 10 goals, while adding 5 assists for 15 points.  Team captain Gus Mortson also had 15 points from the blueline, along with 87 penalty minutes.  Lee Fogolin Sr. led the team in that category though, accumulating 88 penalty minutes.

In goal, Al Rollins played the majority of games, leading the team in wins at 17, and GAA at 2.95.  He also earned 3 shutouts.

Season standings

Record vs. opponents

Game log

Regular season

Season stats

Scoring leaders

Goaltending

References

Sources
 Hockey-Reference
 National Hockey League Guide & Record Book 2007

Chicago Blackhawks seasons
Chicago
Chicago